Richard Tobin may refer to: 
 Richard Tobin (luthier) (–1847), Irish luthier
 Richard M. Tobin (1866–1952), American banker and diplomat
 Dick Tobin (1896–1957), Irish hurler
 Richard J. Tobin (born 1963), American businessman